State Highway 138 (RJ SH 138, SH-138) is a State Highway in Rajasthan state of India that connects Bhopatpura in Bundi district of Rajasthan with Nainwa in Bundi district of Rajasthan. The total length of RJ SH 138 is 103.72 km.

This highway connects SH-29 in Bhopatpura to NH-148D in Nenwa.

References

State Highways in Rajasthan